The 2020 Tennessee Volunteers baseball team will represent the University of Tennessee in the 2020 NCAA Division I baseball season. The Volunteers will play their home games at Lindsey Nelson Stadium.

Previous season

The Volunteers finished 40–21 overall, and 14–16 in the conference.

Preseason

SEC media poll
The SEC media poll was released on February 6, 2020 with the Volunteers predicted to finish in fourth place in the Eastern Division.

Personnel

Roster

Coaching Staff

Schedule and results

Schedule Source:
*Rankings are based on the team's current ranking in the D1Baseball poll.

Rankings

2020 MLB Draft

References

Tennessee
Tennessee Volunteers baseball seasons
Tennessee Volunteers baseball